Cepphis is a genus of moths in the family Geometridae.

Species
 Cepphis advenaria – little thorn (Hübner, 1790)
 Cepphis armataria – scallop moth (Herrich-Schäffer, 1855)
 Cepphis decoloraria – dark scallop moth (Hulst, 1886)

References
 Cepphis at Markku Savela's Lepidoptera and Some Other Life Forms
 Natural History Museum Lepidoptera genus database
Watson, L., and Dallwitz, M.J. 2003 onwards. British insects: the genera of Lepidoptera-Geometridae. Version: 29 December 2011 

Ourapterygini